Anastasia Platonovna Zuyeva (17 December, 1896 – 23 March, 1986) was a Soviet and Russian film and stage actress. People's Artist of the USSR (1957). Winner of the Stalin Prize of the second degree (1952).

Selected filmography 
1932 — Prosperity as classy lady
1940 — Tanya as Agrafena Lukinichna
1940 — Fifth Ocean as Darina Egorovna, Natasha's mother
1941 — Battle Movie Collection No.6 as Praskovya
1944 — Jubilee as Merchutkina
1946 — The First Glove as Privalova
1950 — Donetsk Miners as Yevdokia Prohorovna
1951 — Sporting Honour as Grinko
1952 — The Inspector as Poshlyopkina
1955 — Vasyok Trubachyov and His Comrades as Aunt Dunya
1956 — Case №306 as witness
1958 — A Groom from the Other World as Anna Mikhaylovna
1960 — Russian Souvenir as Egorkina, wife of Siberian hunter
1960 — Dead Souls as Korobochka
1960 — Resurrection as Matryona Kharina
1964 — Jack Frost as narrator
1964 — There Is Such a Lad as Marfa
1965 — Loneliness as Aksinia
1968 — Fire, Water, and Brass Pipes as narrator
1969 — Late Flowers as Prohorovna
1970 — Barbara the Fair with the Silken Hair as narrator
1971 — Married Elderly Couple as Avdotya Nikitichna
1972 — Day by Day as old nurse
1973 — The Golden Horns as narrator
1977 — Chekhov Pages as old woman
1978 — Again Aniskin as Lizaveta Grigorievna Tolstykh
1982 — Along Unknown Paths as Glafira Andreyevna, grandmother

References

External links

 Анастасия Зуева — Энциклопедия отечественного кино 

1896 births
1986 deaths
20th-century Russian actresses
People from Novomoskovsky District
People from Venyovsky Uyezd
Honored Artists of the RSFSR
People's Artists of the RSFSR
People's Artists of the USSR
Stalin Prize winners
Recipients of the Order of Friendship of Peoples
Recipients of the Order of Lenin
Recipients of the Order of the Red Banner of Labour
Actresses from the Russian Empire
Memoirists from the Russian Empire
Russian film actresses
Russian memoirists
Russian stage actresses
Russian voice actresses
Soviet film actresses
Soviet memoirists
Soviet stage actresses
Soviet voice actresses
Burials at Novodevichy Cemetery